The Reflex J 320 is a French paramotor that was designed by Dominique Cholou and produced by Reflex Paramoteur of Chatou for powered paragliding. Now out of production, when it was available the aircraft was supplied complete and ready-to-fly.

Design and development
The J 320 was designed to comply with the European microlight regulations. It features a paraglider-style wing, single-place accommodation and a single JPX D-320  engine in pusher configuration with a 2.38:1 ratio reduction drive and a  diameter three-bladed composite propeller.

As is the case with all paramotors, take-off and landing is accomplished by foot. Inflight steering is accomplished via handles that actuate the canopy brakes, creating roll and yaw.

Specifications (J 320)

References

J 320
2000s French ultralight aircraft
Single-engined pusher aircraft
Paramotors